USS Weehawken was a name used by the U.S. Navy more than once in naming its vessels:

 , a single-turreted monitor, launched on 5 November 1862
 , a minelayer, built in 1920 by William Cramp & Sons at Philadelphia
 , a large harbor tug, laid down in August 1964 at Marinette, Wisconsin

References 

United States Navy ship names